Princess Lalla Fatima Zohra (29 June 1929 – 10 August 2014) was the eldest daughter of Mohammed V of Morocco and his first wife, Lalla Hanila bint Mamoun. On 16 August 1961 (in a triple ceremony with her sisters, Aisha, Malika and their husbands) she was married at the Dar al-Makhzin in Rabat to her cousin, Prince Moulay Ali Alaoui (1924–1988), ambassador of Morocco to France (1964–1966). She has two sons and one daughter: Sharif Moulay Abdallah (born c. 1965), Sharif Moulay Youssef (born c. 1969) and Princess Lalla Joumala (born 1962), ambassador of Morocco to the United Kingdom since 2009.

Honours

National honours
 Dame Grand Cordon of the Order of the Throne.

References

1930 births
2014 deaths
People from Rabat
Moroccan exiles in Madagascar
Commandeurs of the Légion d'honneur
Daughters of kings